Japanese football in 1925.

Emperor's Cup

National team

Results

Players statistics

Births
June 24 - Masanori Tokita
August 24 - Toshio Iwatani

External links

 
Seasons in Japanese football